Hymenocallis proterantha is a species of spider lily known only from  Mexico (States of Colima, Jalisco, Michoacán, Nayarit).

References

proterantha
Flora of Mexico
Plants described in 1989